Claudia is a female given name equivalent to Claudius or Claudio. In Portuguese, it is accented Cláudia. A variant and cognate form is Klaudia. It was originally used to refer to any woman who belonged to the ancient Roman Claudia gens.

Given name
Claudia of Chalon (1498–1521), nobility
Claudia Felicitas of Austria (1653–1676), Holy Roman Empress

A–E
Cláudia Abreu (born 1970), Brazilian actress
Claudia Alexander (1959–2015), NASA scientist and project manager
Claudia Bandion-Ortner (born 1966), Austrian judge and politician
Claudia Bär (born 1980), German canoer
Claudia Beamish (born 1952), Scottish politician
Claudia Beni (born 1986), Croatian singer
Claudia Black (born 1972), Australian actress
Claudia Bryar (1918–2011), American actress
Claudia Bühlmann, Swiss bobsledder
Claudia Cardinale (born 1938), Italian actress
Cláudia Cepeda (born 1967), Brazilian actress
Claudia Christian (born 1965), American actress
Claudia Ciesla (born 1987), German model and actress
Claudia Cowan, American journalist
Claudia Czado, German statistician
Claudia Doumit, American cinema actress
Claudia Dreher (born 1971), German runner

F–M
Claudia Fährenkemper (born 1959), German photographer
Claudia Faniello (born 1988), Maltese singer
Claudia Fontaine (1960-2018), English singer
Claudia Fontán (born 1966), Argentine actress
Claudia Fragapane (born 1997), British artistic gymnast
Claudia Franco (born 1975), Spanish swimmer
Claudia Giovine (born 1990), Italian tennis player
Claudia di Girolamo (born 1956), Chilean actress
Cláudia Graner (born 1974), Brazilian water polo player
Claudia Hammond (born 1971), British author and journalist
Claudia Haro, American actress
Claudia Hempel (born 1958), German swimmer
Claudia Hürtgen (born 1971), German race driver
Claudia Jennings (1949–1979), American model and actress
Claudia Jessie (born 1989), English actress
Claudia L. Johnson, American literary scholar
Claudia Jones (1915–1964), Trinidad-born journalist and activist
Claudia Jordan (born 1973), American model
Claudia Jung (born 1964), German singer and politician
Claudia Karvan (born 1972), Australian actress
Claudia Kemfert (born 1968), German economist 
Claudia J. Kennedy (born 1947), United States Army general
Claudia Kim (born 1985), South Korean actress
Claudia Klüppelberg, German statistician
Claudia Kohde-Kilsch (born 1963), German tennis player
Claudia Koll (born 1965), Italian actress and missionary
Claudia Kreuzig Grinnell, German-American poet
Claudia Kristofics-Binder (born 1961), Austrian figure skater
Claudia Lau (born 1992), Hong Kong competitive swimmer
Claudia Lawrence (born 1974), British missing person
Claudia Leistner (born 1965), German figure skater
Claudia Leitte (born 1980), Brazilian singer
Claudia Lennear, American singer
Claudia Lichtenberg (born 1985), German cyclist
Claudia Losch (born 1960), German shot putter
Claudia Lösch (born 1988), Austrian alpine skier
Claudia Guadalupe Martinez, American children's author
Claudia Malvenuto, Italian mathematician
Claudia Melchers (born 1969), Dutch kidnap victim
Claudia S. Miller, author and immunologist 
Claudia Mo (born 1957), Hong Kong journalist and politician
Claudia Moatti (born 1954), French historian specialised in Roman Studies
Cláudia Monteiro (born 1961), Brazilian tennis player
Claudia Müller (footballer) (born 1974), German footballer
Claudia Müller-Ebeling (born 1956), German anthropologist and art historian

N–Z
Cláudia das Neves (born 1975), Brazilian basketball player
Claudia Novelo (born 1965), Mexican swimmer
Claudia Nystad (born 1978), German skier
Claudia O'Doherty (born 1983), Australian comedienne and actress
Claudia Ortiz (born 1981), Peruvian beauty pageant contestant
Claudia Palacios (born 1977), Colombian journalist
Claudia M. Palena, Argentine-American immunologist and cancer researcher 
Claudia Pandolfi (born 1974), Italian actress
Cláudia Pascoal (born 1994), Portuguese singer
Claudia Pavel (born 1984), Romanian singer
Claudia Pavlovich Arellano (born 1969), Mexican politician and lawyer
Claudia Pechstein (born 1972), German speed skater
Claudia Polini, Italian-American mathematician
Claudia Poll (born 1972), Costa Rican swimmer
Claudia Porwik (born 1968), German tennis player
Claudia Pond Eyley (born 1946), New Zealand artist and filmmaker
Claudia Presăcan (born 1979), Romanian gymnast
Claudia Riegler (born 1973), Austrian snowboarder
Claudia Riegler (born 1976), New Zealand alpine skier
Claudia Rivas (born 1989), Mexican triathlete
Claudia Roth (born 1955), German politician 
Claudia Schiffer (born 1970), German model and actress
Claudia Sheinbaum (born 1962), Mexican scientist, politician, and Mayor of Mexico City
Claudia Ștef (born 1978), Romanian race walker
Claudia Tavel (born 1989), Bolivian beauty pageant contestant
Claudia Alta Taylor Johnson (Lady Bird Johnson, 1912–2007), First Lady of the United States
Claudia Uhle (born 1976), German singer
Claudia van den Heiligenberg (born 1985), Dutch footballer
Claudia Velásquez (born 1975), Peruvian swimmer
Claudia Webbe (born 1965), British politician
Claudia Winterstein (born 1950), German politician
Claudia Wells (born 1966), American actress
Claudia Winkleman (born 1972), English journalist

Middle name
Ana Cláudia Lemos (born 1988), Brazilian sprinter
Ana Cláudia Michels (born 1981), Brazilian model

Fictional characters
Claudia, a Spanish nail salon beautician in the British web series Corner Shop Show
Claudia Blaisdel Carrington, character from the soap opera Dynasty
Claudia Bradford, a character on the TV sitcom Three's a Crowd
Claudia Brown, from ITV's Primeval
Claudia Donovan, a character in the television series Warehouse 13
Claudia Enfield, character in the light novel series The Asterisk War
Claudia Grant, Robotech character
Claudia Hammond, Home and Away character
Claudia Henderson, mother of Dustin Henderson in Netflix TV series Stranger Things
Claudia Hernandez, character in the television series 24
Claudia Joy Holden, character in the television series Army Wives
Claudia Kincaid, protagonist of E. L. Konigsburg's novel From the Mixed-Up Files of Mrs. Basil E. Frankweiler
Claudia Lynn Kishi, from Ann Martin's book series The Baby-Sitters Club
Claudia LaSalle, Macross character
 Claudia Mockelberg, a character in Robin Cook's Mortal Fear.
Claudia (The Vampire Chronicles), from Anne Rice's Interview with the Vampire
Claudia Whittaker, character from the soap opera Knots Landing
Claudia Wolf, the antagonist of the video game Silent Hill 3
Claudia Zacchara (born 1969), General Hospital character
C. J. Cregg, Claudia Jean Cregg, a character in the television series The West Wing
Claudia Tiedemann, a character in the Netflix TV series Dark

References

Dutch feminine given names
English feminine given names
German feminine given names
Italian feminine given names
Latin feminine given names
Romanian feminine given names
Spanish feminine given names